ONE is the debut album by American alternative hip hop artist Me Phi Me. It was released in 1992 (see 1992 in music) via RCA Records. Generally considered the first folk-rap album, ONE was a critics darling in the United States and Europe, though sales were limited. A fusion of acoustic guitars, spacey synthesizers, and live funk beats, the album established the Me Phi Me band as one of the more progressive hip-hop groups.

The song "Keep It Goin'" was chosen as the opening and closing theme for Fox's short-lived anthology drama Tribeca. Its guitar intro would also be sampled for the song "Here We Come," which Me Phi Me recorded for the film Strange Days.

Critical acclaim 
AllMusic called the album "an intriguing concept -- few rappers have attempted a folk-rap fusion, especially ones with neo-psychedelic overtones -- but [Me Phi Me's] songwriting isn't always capable of conveying his ideas." The Washington Post hailed it as an album that "adventurous hip-hop fans should add to their collections." The New York Times called ONE "a radical departure," writing that "it's an odd mixture that uses pop music to express a democratic, pluralistic urge." The Chicago Reader called it "unquestionably the loveliest rap album ever recorded."

The A.V. Club, in an article about the "least essential" albums of the 1990s, deemed the album's "hippified, folky space-rap" a trend that never caught on.

Track listing
1. Intro: A Call to Arms (The Step) 1:54
2. The Credo 1:20
3. Sad New Day 5:28
4. Poetic Moment I: The Dream 3:74
5. Dream of You	3:56
6. Not My Brotha 4:17
7. Keep It Goin' 3:57
8. Poetic Moment II: The Streets :54
9. Black Sunshine 3:49
10. And I Believe (The Credo) 4:39
11. Pu' Sho Hands 2Getha 3:52
12. Poetic Moment III: The Light :31
13. Road to Life 4:24
14. It Ain't the Way It Was 4:59
15. (Think) Where Are You Going? 4:33
16. Return to Arms: In Closing :41

Personnel
Me Phi Me – Vocals
Christopher Cuben-Tatum – Producer, Vocals, Bass, Keyboards, Drums
John Michael Falasz III – 12-String Acoustic Guitars, Vocals
Michael Franks – Background Vocals
Rags Murtaugh – Harmonica
Ladysmith Black Mambazo – Accent Vocals
Djivan Gasparyan – Armenian Dudek
Count Bass D – Frat Stepping, Vocals

Chart positions
Billboard Music Charts (North America) – singles:
 1992	Sad New Day	Hot 100 Singles	 No. 60
 1992	Pu' Sho Hands 2Getha	R&B Singles	 No. 71

References

External links
Official Site
Official MySpace Page
Lyrics

1992 debut albums
Me Phi Me albums